Fred Hussman (January 3, 1876 – January 23, 1940) was an American wrestler. He competed in the men's freestyle lightweight at the 1904 Summer Olympics.

References

External links
 

1876 births
1940 deaths
American male sport wrestlers
Olympic wrestlers of the United States
Wrestlers at the 1904 Summer Olympics
Sportspeople from Missouri